Felipe Smith (born 1978) is an American comic book writer and artist of Jamaican and Argentine descent. He is the creator, co-designer, and writer of Robbie Reyes Ghost Rider, and the author of Peepo Choo, a manga series debuting in 2009 in Kodansha's Morning 2 monthly magazine. It is the first manga created & serialized in Japan by a Western creator before being licensed for an English-language release.

Early life 
When Smith was five-years-old he moved with his family to Buenos Aires, Argentina, where he studied at an international school. Smith’s artistic ambitions were sparked at an early age; as he grew up, he became known for his talent in art, and the attention surrounding his work motivated him to keep it up. As Smith completed high school in Buenos Aires, he decided to have art be the focus of his professional life and he returned to the U.S. for college. After graduating from the School of the Art Institute of Chicago (SAIC), Smith moved to Los Angeles to pursue a career in animation.

Career 
Smith began his career in comics in 2005 and was living in Los Angeles when he wrote and drew his first 3-volume graphic novel series, the semi-autobiographical MBQ. As the buzz about his series reached Japan, he was contacted by a prominent book agent who was interested in representing him in that country. Together they organized a meeting at San Diego Comic-Con 2007 with an editor in chief from Kodansha, the largest Japanese publishing company at the time. 

As a result, in 2008 Smith moved to Tokyo to publish his second 3-volume graphic novel series, Peepo Choo, one of the first manga titles created by a non-Japanese native and initially serialized by Kodansha for a Japanese audience before it was later released in English by Vertical Inc. Smith worked four years in the Japanese market; when he returned to L.A. in 2012, he joined Nickelodeon's Teenage Mutant Ninja Turtles animated TV series, first in the storyboard department and then as a full-time character designer.  

In 2014 Marvel Comics announced Smith as the writer of monthly All-New Ghost Rider and creator of its protagonist, Robbie Reyes. From the start, Smith was given complete freedom to create the character’s personality and background and the setting in which events in the series take place; he also sketched the preliminary visual designs. Smith's co-creation for Marvel crossed over from Publishing to Television in 2016, when Robbie Reyes made his first appearance in Marvel's Agents of S.H.I.E.L.D.; the character was played by Gabriel Luna.

References

Bibliography

External links 
 Felipe Smith's DeviantArt Gallery
 Interview: Felipe Smith – Creator of Peepo Choo and MBQ
 From ‘Peepo Choo’ To ‘Ghost Rider': The Unusually Cool Career Of Felipe Smith (Interview)
 FELIPE SMITH is back on his creator-owned shit with his first Kickstarter campaign!

School of the Art Institute of Chicago alumni
Living people
21st-century American writers
American graphic novelists
Novelists from Ohio
Writers from Akron, Ohio
Artists from Ohio
Artists from Akron, Ohio
American comics writers
American comics artists
American male voice actors
1978 births